Kent Jönsson (born 9 May 1955) is a former Swedish football defender who played the majority of his career for Malmö FF.

Career
Jönsson transferred from Lunds BoIS to Malmö FF in 1974 where it took him a while until he grabbed a spot in the starting line-up. It wasn't until Bo Larsson, a former forward who now played as defender, was injured during the quarter-finals of the 1978–79 European Cup away against Wisla Krakow. Malmö made it all the way to the final and Jönsson was in the starting line-up for Malmö who ultimately lost the game 1–0 at the Olympic Stadium in Munich. Jönsson won Allsvenskan two times with the club. During the end of his career he transferred to IFK Trelleborg where was a youth coach briefly after his career had ended.

References

1955 births
Swedish footballers
Sweden international footballers
Footballers from Skåne County
Malmö FF players
Allsvenskan players
Living people
Association football defenders